The women's Laser Radial competition at the 2018 Asian Games was held from 24 to 31 August 2018. It was also the qualification tournament for Laser Radial Class at the 2020 Summer Olympics.

Schedule
All times are Western Indonesia Time (UTC+07:00)

Results
Legend
DNC — Did not come to the starting area
DNE — Disqualification not excludable
DNF — Did not finish
DSQ — Disqualification
RET — Retired

References

External links
Official website

Women's Laser Radial